Onlywomen Press (briefly known as The Women's Press) was a feminist press based in London. It was the only feminist press to be founded by out lesbians, Lilian Mohin, Sheila Shulman, and Deborah Hart. It commenced publishing in 1974 and was one of five notably active feminist publishers in the 1990s.

Onlywomen was unique from other British feminist presses because it both printed and published material. This allowed them to control all parts of the "chain of cultural production" and to "subsidize publishing activity" by printing books.

Between 1986 and 1988 it published the journal Gossip: A Journal of Lesbian Feminist Ethics.

Writers published in the press often read their work at Gay's the Word.

A number of noted lesbian writers published by Onlywomen Press include Anna Livia, Margaret Sloan-Hunter, Jay Taverner, Celia Kitzinger and Sue Wilkinson, Sylvia Martin and Sheila Jeffreys.

Its last book, a children's book, was published in 2010.

Works published

Fiction

Poetry 

Carthew, Natasha (1999) Flash Reckless .
 978-0906500705

Nonfiction

Papers

References

Publishing companies established in 1974
1974 establishments in England
Publishing companies disestablished in 2010
2010 disestablishments in England
British companies established in 1974
Publishing companies based in London
LGBT book publishing companies
LGBT culture in London
Lesbian separatism
Lesbian-related mass media
Feminist book publishing companies